The San Francisco Giants are a Major League Baseball franchise based in San Francisco, California. They play in the National League West division. Also known in their early years as the "New York Gothams" (1883–84) and "New York Giants" (1885–1957), pitchers for the Giants have thrown 17 no-hitters in franchise history. A no-hitter is officially recognized by Major League Baseball only "when a pitcher (or pitchers) allows no hits during the entire course of a game, which consists of at least nine innings", although one or more batters "may reach base via a walk, an error, a hit by pitch, a passed ball or wild pitch on strike three, or catcher's interference." No-hitters of less than nine complete innings were previously recognized by the league as official; however, several rule alterations in 1991 changed the rule to its current form. A no-hitter is rare enough that teams may go decades without recording one. A perfect game, a special subcategory of no-hitter, was finally thrown by Matt Cain on June 13, 2012. As defined by Major League Baseball, "in a perfect game, no batter reaches any base during the course of the game." Previously, this feat came closest on July 4, 1908 when Hooks Wiltse was hit by a pitch with two outs in the ninth and a scoreless tie. The plate umpire, Cy Rigler, claimed he should have called the previous pitch strike three, that would have ended the inning with a perfection. Wiltse would go on to retire all three in the tenth to end the game after the Giants scored a run in the top of the tenth.

Amos Rusie threw the first no-hitter in Giants history on July 31, 1891; the most recent no-hitter was thrown by Chris Heston on June 9, 2015. Five left-handed pitchers have thrown no-hitters in franchise history. The other ten pitchers were right-handers, including the most recent no-hitter author, Heston. Tim Lincecum and Hall of Famer Christy Mathewson are the only pitchers to throw more than one no-hitter in a Giants uniform. Ten no-hitters were thrown at home and seven on the road. The Giants threw one in April, two in May, five in June, five in July, one in August, and three in September. The longest interval between no-hitters was between the games pitched by Hubbell and Juan Marichal, encompassing 34 years, 1 month, and 7 days from May 8, 1929 till June 15, 1963. Conversely, the shortest interval between no-hitters was between the two games pitched by Lincecum, a period of 347 days. The Giants have no-hit the Philadelphia Phillies and San Diego Padres the most, doing so three times each—Wiltse in 1908; Jeff Tesreau in 1912; Jesse Barnes in 1922; Jonathan Sánchez in 2009; and Tim Lincecum in 2013 and 2014. Every Giants no-hitter has been a shutout (which is likely, but not a given, considering baserunners can reach, advance, and score by methods other than hits). The most baserunners allowed in a no-hitter was five, which occurred in Lincecum's first no-hitter. Of the 17 no-hitters, four have been won by a score of 1–0, more common than any other result. Those 1–0 no-hitters were attained by Christy Mathewson in 1905, Wiltse in 1908, Juan Marichal in 1963, and Gaylord Perry in 1968. The largest margin of victory in a Giants no-hitter was an 11–0 win by Carl Hubbell in 1929. Matt Cain is tied with Sandy Koufax for the most strikeouts in a perfect no-hitter with 14.

The umpire is also an integral part of any no-hitter. The task of the umpire in a baseball game is to make any decision "which involves judgment, such as, but not limited to, whether a batted ball is fair or foul, whether a pitch is a strike or a ball, or whether a runner is safe or out… [the umpire's judgment on such matters] is final." Part of the duties of the umpire making calls at home plate includes defining the strike zone, which "is defined as that area over homeplate (sic) the upper limit of which is a horizontal line at the midpoint between the top of the shoulders and the top of the uniform pants, and the lower level is a line at the hollow beneath the kneecap." These calls define every baseball game and are therefore integral to the completion of any no-hitter. 16 different umpires presided over each of the franchise's 17 no-hitters.

The manager is another integral part of any no-hitter. The tasks of the manager include determining the starting rotation, the batting order and defensive lineup in every game, and how long a pitcher stays in the game. There have been eight different managers in the franchise's 17 no-hitters.

No-hitters

Notes

References

External links
Giants Rare Feats at MLB.com

No hitters
San Francisco Giants